This is a list of candidates of the 1965 New South Wales state election. The election was held on 1 May 1965.

Retiring Members
Note: Liberal MLAs Geoffrey Cox (Vaucluse) and Les Ford (Dubbo) died in late 1964 while Labor MLA John Seiffert Sr (Monaro) died in January 1965. No by-elections were held.

Labor
 George Enticknap MLA (Murrumbidgee)
 Ray Maher MLA (Wyong)
 Jim Robson MLA (Hartley)
 Thomas Ryan MLA (Auburn)
 Laurie Tully MLA (Goulburn)
 Ernest Wetherell MLA (Cobar)

Liberal
 Eric Hearnshaw MLA (Eastwood)
 Harold Jackson MLA (Gosford)
 Doug Padman MLA (Albury)

Legislative Assembly
Sitting members are shown in bold text. Successful candidates are highlighted in the relevant colour. Where there is possible confusion, an asterisk (*) is also used.

See also
 Members of the New South Wales Legislative Assembly, 1965–1968

References
 

1965